The Council of Ministers (or ) is a collegial executive body within the Government of Portugal. It is presided over by the Prime Minister, but the President of Portugal can take on this role at the Prime Minister's request. All senior ministers are members of the Council of Ministers, and when the prime minister finds it applicable, state secretaries can also attend its meetings.

Functions 

The Council of Ministers discusses and approves bills to be submitted to the Assembly of the Republic and decrees and resolutions.

Current Council of Ministers

As of 3 January 2023, the Council of Ministers consists of the following:

The Secretary of State for European Affairs (Tiago Antunes) and the Secretary of State for the Presidency of the Council of Ministers (André Moz Caldas) also attend the meetings of the Council of Ministers, but without voting rights.

Presidency of the Council of Ministers 

The Presidency of the Council of Ministers is the central department of the Government of Portugal whose mission is to provide support to the Council of Ministers, the Prime Minister and the other members of the Government organically integrated there and promote inter-ministerial coordination of the various government departments.

In accordance with the Organic Law of the XXIII Constitutional Government, the Presidency of the Council of Ministers comprises the following members of the Government:

 Prime Minister
 Secretary of State for Digitalisation and Administrative Modernisation
 Minister of the Presidency
 Secretary of State for the Presidency of the Council of Ministers
 Secretary of State for Planning
 Secretary of State for Public Administration
Minister in the Cabinet of the Prime Minister and for Parliamentary Affairs
Secretary of State for Equality and Migration
Secretary of State for Youth and Sports

The Presidency of the Council of Ministers also provides support to the dependent services of the Prime Minister, as well as those of the Minister of the Presidency, Minister in the Cabinet of the Prime Minister and for Parliamentary Affairs, Minister of Culture, Minister of Infrastructure and Housing, and the Minister of Territorial Cohesion.

See also

Cabinet (government)
Politics of Portugal

References

External links
 Government of Portugal Official Website

Government of Portugal
Portugal
Politics of Portugal